"Chameleon" is a song by Pnau, released in November 2016 as the lead single from the band's fifth studio album, Changa (2017). It is co-written by band members, Nick Littlemore, his older brother Sam Littlemore, and Peter Mayes. "Chameleon" is the first new original music from Pnau since their album Soft Universe in 2011. The song features vocals from Kira Divine. The song peaked at number 4 on the Australian charts and was certified platinum.
Digital remixes were released on 25 November 2016 and on 26 May 2017.

At the ARIA Music Awards of 2017, the song won the ARIA Award for Best Dance Release.

At the APRA Music Awards of 2018, the song was nominated for Dance Work of the Year and Most Played Australian Work.

Reception
Emily Mack from Music Feeds called the song a "“bonkers” half-schoolyard singalong, half-tribal dancefloor toe-tapper"
Amnplify called the song a "festival favourite and dance floor anthem"
Monique Hughes from Howl and Echoes described the song as "a big, kaleidoscopic, addictively-catchy party single".

Track listing
Digital download
 "Chameleon" – 3:18

Digital download (remixes)
 "Chameleon" (Crookers Remix) – 5:56
 "Chameleon" (LDRU Remix) – 4:25
 "Chameleon" (Dom Dolla Remix) – 5:05
 "Chameleon" (Kormak Remix) – 5:05

Digital download (remixes)
 "Chameleon" (Blonde Remix) – 3:11
 "Chameleon" (Melé Remix) – 4:06
 "Chameleon" (Klue Remix) – 5:05
 "Chameleon" (The Apx Remix) – 5:05

Charts

Weekly charts

Year-end charts

Certifications

Release history

References

2016 songs
2016 singles
Pnau songs
Songs written by Nick Littlemore
Songs written by Peter Mayes
Songs written by Sam Littlemore
Songs written by Luke Steele (musician)
ARIA Award-winning songs